The Uganda Communications Commission (UCC) is the government regulatory body of the communications sector in Uganda. Although owned by the Ugandan government, it acts independently. Its mandated responsibilities include licensing, regulation, communications infrastructure development and the expansion of rural communications service.

Location
The headquarters of the UCC are located at 42-44 Spring Road, in Bugoloobi, a neighborhood in Nakawa Division, in Kampala, the capital of Uganda and the largest city in that country. Other regional offices are located in Gulu, Mbale, Masindi and Mbarara.

History
UCC was created by the Communications Act enacted in 1997, by the Ugandan Parliament. That instrument, split the then Ugandan parastatal, Uganda Posts and Telecommunications Company Limited (UPTCL), into four entities:

 Uganda Communications Commission (UCC) – The communications industry regulator
 Uganda Post Limited – Also known as Posta Uganda
 PostBank Uganda – A government-owned financial institution
 Uganda Telecom – An information technology and communication network company.
In January 2021, Uganda Communications Commission ordered the shutdown of the Internet in Uganda, amid elections.

Organization and operations
The organizational structure of the Commission, is laid out in detail at the Communications Commission's web site.

The Communications Commission runs a film festival to promote the country's film industry.

Rural Communications
The Rural Communications Development Fund (RCDF), was founded in 2003 and is responsible for the development of  communications infrastructure outside of Uganda's urban centers. The RCDF has set standards for its work in the 112 districts of the country. RCDF's scope of work includes: (a) creation of internet points of presence (b) internet training centers (c) creation of internet cafes at every district headquarters (d) creation of web portals for every district (e) maintenance of pay telephones at the ratio of at least one for every 2500 people (f) development of postal projects, Multi-purpose Community Telecentres (MCTs), internet development for schools & health care facilities and (g) development of call centres.

Governance
The chairman of the seven-member communications board is Eng Dr Dorothy Okello. Other board members include; Evelyn Piloya, Jane Kabbale, Rajab Wardah Gyagenda, William Byaruhanga, Norah Muliira and Charles Lwanga Auk. The executive director is Irene Sewankambo.

Initiatives
Uganda Film Festival - A five day annual event aimed at promoting and developing the Ugandan film industry. The festival started in 2013. Workshops, trainings, screenings and outreach projects and the Uganda Film Festival Awards are part of the festival.

See also

References

External links
Uganda Communications Commission

Communications in Uganda
Regulatory agencies of Uganda
Organisations based in Kampala
Communications authorities